is a railway station on the Muroran Main Line in Muroran, Hokkaido, Japan, operated by the Hokkaido Railway Company (JR Hokkaido).

Lines

Station layout
The station consists of a single island platform serving two terminating tracks.

Platforms

Adjacent stations

History

The station opened on 1 July 1897. With the privatization of Japanese National Railways (JNR) on 1 April 1987, the station came under the control of JR Hokkaido.

The station was moved to its current location, 1.1 km closer to Higashi-Muroran, on 1 October 1997.

Surrounding area
 Muroran City Hall
 Iburi Subprefecture
 Cape Chikiu

See also
 List of railway stations in Japan

References

External links

  

Railway stations in Hokkaido Prefecture
Stations of Muroran Main Line
Railway stations in Japan opened in 1897